Karl-Einar Fridolf Sjögren (29 September 1871 – 6 May 1956) was a sailor from Sweden, who represented his native country at the 1908 Summer Olympics in Ryde, Great Britain. Sjögren took the 5th place in the 6-Metre.

Sources

Swedish male sailors (sport)
Sailors at the 1908 Summer Olympics – 6 Metre
Olympic sailors of Sweden
1871 births
1956 deaths
Sportspeople from Stockholm